Atlantic Crossing is the sixth studio album by English singer-songwriter Rod Stewart, released on 15 August 1975. It peaked at number one in the UK (his fifth solo album to do so), and number nine on the Billboard Top Pop Albums chart.

The title indicated Stewart's new commercial and artistic direction, referring to both his crossing over to Warner Brothers and on his departure to escape the 83 per cent top rate of income tax introduced by British Labour Prime Minister Harold Wilson for the jet-set lifestyle in Los Angeles (where he had applied for American citizenship at this time). The album was divided into a fast side and a slow side, apparently at the suggestion of Stewart's then-girlfriend, Swedish actress Britt Ekland. Stewart would repeat the format for his next two albums.

The album contained two of Stewart's most popular songs, "Sailing" and "I Don't Want to Talk About It”, and classic rock favorites "Three Time Loser" and "Stone Cold Sober".

With Atlantic Crossing, Stewart ended his association with Ronnie Wood, Ian McLagan and the stable of musicians who had been his core collaborators on his classic run of albums for Mercury Records, fusing soul and folk. Instead, he used a group of session musicians, including The Memphis Horns and three-quarters of Booker T. and the MG's. The album was produced by Tom Dowd, the famous engineer and producer on records by so many of Stewart's heroes during Dowd's time on staff at Atlantic Records. The only song performed from this album on The Faces' final US tour in autumn 1975 was "Three Time Loser", and the rest of the group heavily disliked Stewart's change in musical direction on this album. Following the success of the album, and his move to the U.S., Stewart announced his exit from the Faces by the end of the year.

"Sailing" was a number one hit in the UK in September 1975, and returned to the UK Top 3 a year later when it was used as the theme for the BBC series Sailor; both acoustic and electric guitars in the song were played by Pete Carr. In 1977, almost two years after the album was released, Stewart scored another UK number one from the album with the double A-side single "I Don't Want to Talk About It" and "The First Cut Is the Deepest" (from the album A Night on the Town - 1976).

In 2009, Rhino Records released a two-disc version of the album with bonus tracks.

Track listing
Fast Side (Side One)
 "Three Time Loser" (Rod Stewart) – 4:03
 "Alright for an Hour" (Stewart, Jesse Ed Davis) – 4:17
 "All in the Name of Rock 'N' Roll" (Stewart) – 5:02
 "Drift Away" (Mentor Williams) – 3:43
 "Stone Cold Sober" (Stewart, Steve Cropper) – 4:12

Slow Side (Side Two)
 "I Don't Want to Talk About It" (Danny Whitten) – 4:47
 "It's Not The Spotlight" (Barry Goldberg, Gerry Goffin) – 4:21
 "This Old Heart of Mine" (Lamont Dozier, Brian Holland, Eddie Holland, Sylvia Moy) – 4:04
 "Still Love You" (Stewart) – 5:08
 "Sailing" (Gavin Sutherland) – 4:37

2009 two disc re-release
Disc one
Track 1 – 10 features the original album.
"Skye Boat Song (The Atlantic Crossing Drum & Pipe Band)" (Harold Boulton, Annie MacLeod) 4:13

Disc two
"To Love Somebody"  (Barry Gibb, Robin Gibb) – 4:12
"Holy Cow"  (Allen Toussaint) – 3:16
"Return to Sender"  (Otis Blackwell, Scott Winfield) – 3:42
"Three Time Loser" [Alternate Version] (Stewart) – 4:40
"Alright for an Hour" [Alternate Version] (Stewart, Davis) – 4:36
"All in the Name of Rock 'n' Roll" [Alternate Version] (Stewart) – 5:00
"Drift Away" [Alternate Version] (Williams) – 3:58
"Too Much Noise" [Early Version of "Stone Cold Sober"] (Stewart, Cropper) – 3:24
"I Don't Want to Talk About It" [Alternate Version] (Whitten) – 4:56
"It's Not the Spotlight" [Alternate Version] (Goldberg, Goffin) – 4:27
"This Old Heart of Mine" [Alternate Version]  (Holland-Dozier-Holland, Moy) – 3:54
"Still Love You" [Alternate Version] (Stewart) 4:57
"Sailing" [Alternate Version] (Sutherland) 4:39
"Skye Boat Song (The Atlantic Crossing Drum & Pipe Band)" [Alternate Version] (Boulton, MacLeod) 4:20

Personnel
 Rod Stewart – vocals
 Pete Carr – acoustic guitar and electric guitar on Sailing
 Jesse Ed Davis – guitars
 Steve Cropper – guitars
 Fred Tackett – guitars
 Jimmy Johnson – guitars
 Barry Beckett – keyboards
 Albhy Galuten – keyboards
 Booker T. Jones – Hammond organ
 Donald "Duck" Dunn – bass
 Lee Sklar – bass
 Bob Glaub – bass
 David Hood – bass
 David Lindley – mandolin, violin
 Al Jackson, Jr. – drums, percussion
 Roger Hawkins – drums, percussion
 Nigel Olsson – drums, percussion
 Willie Correa – drums, percussion
 The Memphis Horns – trumpet, trombone, saxophone
 Cindy & Bob Singers, The Pets & The Clappers – backing vocals

String arrangements by Arif Mardin and James Mitchell

Album designer and art direction Kosh illustrator by Peter Lloyd

Charts

Weekly charts

Year-end charts

Certifications

References

1975 albums
Riva Records albums
Rod Stewart albums
Albums produced by Tom Dowd
Warner Records albums
Albums recorded at Muscle Shoals Sound Studio
Albums recorded at Wally Heider Studios